The last two Gujarat Sultans, Ahmad Shah III and Mahmud Shah III, were raised to throne when they were young so the nobles were ruling the Sultanate. The nobles divided territories between themselves but soon started fighting between themselves for supremacy. One noble invited the Mughal emperor Akbar to intervene in 1572 which resulted in the conquest of Gujarat by 1573 and Gujarat becoming the province of the Mughal Empire.

Background

The last two Gujarat Sultans, Ahmad Shah III and Mahmud Shah III, were raised to the throne when they were young. So the nobles had decided to carry on the government under one noble as a regent of the Sultan and they further divided the country among themselves, each one undertaking to protect the frontiers and preserve the public peace. They protected the Sultanate from outside threats such as Mubárak Sháh, the ruler of Khandesh. But the nobles had their own aspirations so started looking for opportunity to expand their territories with intention of the supremacy. They continued to fight among themselves and occasionally invited neighbouring countries and powers in the conflict. During one such instance, Khandesh gained Dultanpur and Nandubar from nobles for not invading Gujarat. On another occasion, one noble Changíz Khán had attacked Surat to take vengeance for his father's death and took help from the Portuguese who gained districts of Daman and Sanjan in return. One noble Itimad Khan, with view of becoming independent and supreme, continued to engage in power struggle with other nobles. When some nobles laid siege to Ahmedabad to drive out Itimad Khan, he turned for help to the powerful Mughal emperor Akbar ruling from Delhi. Akbar, glad of any pretext for driving the rebel Mírzás who had previously been driven out of India by Akbar, from their place of refuge in Southern Gujarát, was not slow in availing himself of Ítimád Khán's proposal. On 2 July 1572, he started for Áhmedábád from his capital at Fatehpur Sikri.

Conquest of Gujarat
To the nobles thus fighting among themselves, news was brought that the emperor Akbar was at Disa. Ibráhím Husain Mírza returned to Bharuch and the army of the noble Fauládis of Patan dispersed which resulted in end of the siege of Ahmedabad. From Disa, the Mughal troops advanced to Pátan and then to Jotána, thirty miles south of Pátan. Gujarat Sultán Muzaffar Shah III, who had separated from the Fauládis of Patan, fell into the hands of the emperor, who granted him his life but placed him under charge of one of his nobles named Karam Áli.

When the Mughal army reached Kadi, the nobles; Ítimád Khán, Ikhtiyár Khán, Álaf Khán, and Jhujhár Khán; met Akbar and another noble Sayad Hámid also was honoured with an audience at Hájipur. The emperor imprisoned opposing nobles, Álaf Khán and Jhujhár Khán Habshi, and encouraged the other Gujarát nobles. One noble Ikhtiyár-ul-Mulk now fled to Lunawada, and the emperor, fearing that others of the Gujarát nobles might follow his example, sent Ítimád Khán to Khambhat and placed him under the charge of Shahbáz Khán Kambo. From Áhmedábád, Akbar advanced to Khambhat. At this time Ibráhím Mírza held Baroda, Muhammad Husain Mírza held Surat, and Sháh Mírza held Champaner. On leaving Khambaht to expel the Mírzas, Akbar appointed Mírza Âzíz Kokaltásh his first viceroy of Gujarát.
.

At Baroda, Akbar heard that Ibráhím Mírza had treacherously killed Rustam Khán Rúmi, who was Changíz Khán's governor of Bharuch. The emperor recalled the detachment he had sent against Surat, and overtaking the Mírza at Sarnál or Thásra on the right bank of the Mahi river about twenty-three miles north-east of Nadiad, after a bloody conflict routed him. The Mírza fled by Ahmednagar to Sirohi, and Akbar rejoined his camp at Baroda. The emperor now sent a force under Sháh Kuli Khán to invest the fort of Surat, and following in person pitched his camp at Gopi Talav, a suburb of that city. After an obstinate defence of one month and seventeen days, the garrison under Hamzabán, a slave of Humáyún's who had joined the Mírzás, surrendered. Hamzabán was in treaty with the Portuguese. Under his invitation a large party of Portuguese came to Surat during the siege, but seeing the strength of the Mughal army, represented themselves as ambassadors and besought the honour of an interview. While at Surat, the emperor received from Bihár or Vihárji the Rája of Baglan, Sharfuddín Husain Mírza whom the Rája had captured. After the capture of Surat, the emperor ordered the great Sulaimáni cannon which had been brought by the Turks with the view of destroying the Portuguese forts and left by them in Surat, to be taken to Agra. Surat was placed in the charge of Kalíj Khán. The emperor now advanced to Áhmedábád, where the mother of Changíz Khán came and demanded justice on Jhujhár Khán for having wantonly slain her son. As her complaint was just, the emperor ordered Jhujhár Khán to be thrown under the feet of an elephant. Muhammad Khán, son of Sher Khán Fauládi, who had fled to the Idar hills, now returned and took the city of Pátan, besieging the Mughal governor, Sayad Áhmed Khán Bárha, in the citadel. At this time Mírza Muhammad Husain was at Ranpur near Dhandhuka. When Sher Khán Fauládi, who had taken refuge in Sorath, heard of Muhammad Khán's return to Pátan, he met Mírza Muhammad Husain, and uniting their forces they joined Muhammad Khán at Pátan. The viceroy Mírza Âzíz Kokaltásh with other nobles marched against them, and after a hard-fought battle, in which several of the Mughal nobles were slain, Mírza Âzíz Kokaltásh was victorious. Sher Khán again took refuge in Sorath, and his son fled for safety to the Ídar hills, while the Mírza withdrew to the Khándesh frontier. As the conquest of Gujarát was completed in 1573, Akbar returned to Agra with the last Gujarat Sultán Muzaffar Shah III as a captive.

Akbar built Buland Darwaza at Fatehpur Sikri in 1575 to commemorate his victory over Gujarat.

Aftermath 

Muzaffar Shah III escaped from the captivity and took asylum under Jam Sataji of Nawanagar in Kathiawar region. The battle to save him was fought in July 1591 (Vikram Samvat 1648). The Kathiawar army included the armies of Junagadh and Kundla who betrayed Nawanagar and joined the Mughal army at last. The battle led to large number of casualties on both sides. The battle resulted in the decisive victory of Mughal army and Gujarat finally and completely fell under Mughal empire.

References

Bibliography

  

Wars involving the Mughal Empire
1573 in India
Gujarat under Mughal Empire